The Armeesportvereinigung Vorwärts (Army Sports Club Forward), briefly  ASV Vorwärts, was the sport organisation of the German Democratic Republic's National People's Army (NVA) and its predecessor, the Barracked People's Police (Kasernierte Volkspolizei).

Together with the sport clubs and the SV Dynamo, the ASV Vorwärts was one of the most important supports of the East German elite sports system.
From their clubs in Potsdam, Frankfurt (Oder), Neubrandenburg, Stralsund or Rostock emerged well-known sportsmen like the boxer Henry Maske or the canoeist Birgit Fischer.

In almost every city with barracks or other army installations the ASV kept a training center. Apart from providing the training equipment, the most important task of the local sections was the promotion of youth sports.

The uniform ASV tracksuit, brown polyamide with yellow and red stripes on the arms and the oval ASV emblem on the left chest, attained very popular cult status amongst youth after the German reunification.

History

The Central Training Administration (de) (HVA) founded its own sports association SV Vorwärts der HVA Leipzig  in Leipzig in 1950. In the same year, the Main Administration Sea Police (de) (HVS) founded its own sports association SV Sturmvogel in Parow. The Barracked People's Police  (KVP) was then established by the HSA on 1 July 1952. The sports association SV Vorwärts der HVA was consequently renamed SV Vorwärts der KVP. SV Sturmvogel was joined with SV Vorwärts der KVP on 1 August 1953.

Rowing Honours

Henley Royal Regatta

References

External links 
 Book: "Kämpfer in rot-gelb"; Publisher: Komitee der Armeesportvereinigung Vorwärts; Year: Leipzig, Offizin Andersen Nexö, 1986; Authors: Wolfgang Spitzner, Peter Schorcht; Graphical design: Siegfried Hempel; Scope: 310 S; 5,7 cm x 5,8 cm 
 Sport Komplett
 The explanation of the ASV in German.

Athletics clubs in Germany
Defunct sports governing bodies in Germany
Sports clubs in East Germany
National People's Army
Multi-sport clubs in Germany
Military sport in Germany
 
Military sports governing bodies
Sports organizations established in 1950
1950 establishments in East Germany